Namtok Chat Trakan National Park is a national park located in Chat Trakan and Nakhon Thai Districts of Phitsanulok Province of Thailand, established in 1987. It encompasses Lam Kwae Noi, Daeng and Chat Trakan forests a substantial portion of Chat Trakan District.

Topography
Most of the park is mountains covered with dipterocarp forest. The source of several rivers is within the park, including the Khwae Noi River and its tributary the Phak River.

Chat Trakan Waterfall
The Chat Trakan Waterfall, a.k.a. Pak Rong Waterfall, is located within the park. The sandy beach near the falls is suitable for swimming. Some of the cliffs near the falls are inscribed with yet unexplained rock carvings. The stream from the waterfall joins the Phak River.

History
A survey called "Khao Ya Puk Forest Park" was set up, in March 1982 the name changed to "Namtok Chat Trakan Forest Park". Later half of the surveyed areas should be designated as a national park. Namtok Chat Trakan, with an area of 339,375 rai ~ , was proposed for inclusion in the national parks system in 1985. Namtok Chat Trakan was declared the 55th national park on 2 November 1987. Since 2002 this national park has been managed by Protected Areas Regional Office 11 (Phitsanulok)

Climate
Rainy season is between June and October. Winter from November till February is very cold at night.

Flora
Plants in the park are:

Fauna
In the park are the following mammals:

Birds,the park has some 60 species, of which 44 species of passerine from 19 families, represented by one species:

and some 16 species of non-passerine from 9 families, represented by one species:

Places
 Namtok Chat Trakan - 7 tiers waterfall (total distance .
 Namtok Na Chan - a 7 tiers waterfall.
 Tham Pha Kradan Lek - a cave with pre-historic carvings.
 Khao Chang Luang - a sandstone mountain.

Location

Gallery

See also
 List of national parks of Thailand
 List of Protected Areas Regional Offices of Thailand

References

National parks of Thailand
Luang Prabang Range
Tourist attractions in Phitsanulok province
Protected areas established in 1987
1987 establishments in Thailand